is a 2008 Japanese mystery-thriller film based on the novel, The Devotion of Suspect X, directed by Hiroshi Nishitani. The film was a continuation of the popular Japanese serial drama Galileo and included the same cast. It topped Japan's box office for four consecutive weeks and was the third-highest-grossing Japanese movie in 2008. The soundtrack was released on October 1, 2008. Suspect X was the first of several film adaptations of The Devotion of Suspect X, followed by film adaptations such as Perfect Number (2012) from South Korea and Kolaigaran (2019) from India.

Plot
A murder has occurred and the police are unable to find loopholes in the alibi of the main suspect, thus creating obstacles in the investigation.

Yasuko Hanaoka (Yasuko Matsuyuki) is a divorced, single mother who owns a restaurant. Tetsuya Ishigami (Shinichi Tsutsumi) is a reclusive, but brilliant mathematics teacher, who lives next door of Yasuko and Misato (Yasuko's daughter). Ishigami is solemn and introverted, and his morning exchanges with Yasuko from whose restaurant he buys lunch, is the brightest part of his day. When Togashi (Yasuko's abusive ex-husband) shows up one night to extort money from Yasuko, threatening both her and her teenaged daughter Misato, the situation quickly escalates into violence and Togashi is killed by mother and daughter on the apartment floor. Overhearing the commotion from his room and deducing that Togashi has been killed, Ishigami offers his help to the mother and daughter. He not only disposes the body, but also plots the cover-up step-by-step.

When the body turns up and is identified, Yasuko comes under suspicion. Detective Kaoru Utsumi (Kō Shibasaki) and her superior Detective Shunpei Kusanagi seeks the help of Professor Manabu Yukawa (Masaharu Fukuyama), who seeing the case has nothing to do with physics, initially refuses to help. However, hearing that his genius classmate, Ishigami is the neighbour of the suspect, Yukawa changes his mind. After a happy reunion with Ishigami, for whom he has high admiration, he begins to doubt whether Ishigami had something to do with the murder, and decides to investigate the case on his own. A high level battle of wits ensues as Ishigami tries to protect Yasuko by outmaneuvering and outthinking Yukawa, who faces his most clever and determined opponent yet. Yukawa finally succeeds in cracking the case only to reveal a sad and shocking truth, that will do no good to all parties, save the police. Despite having a reputation of being detached when solving cases, Yukawa is distraught by the outcome this time.

Cast
Masaharu Fukuyama as Manabu Yukawa
Kō Shibasaki as Kaoru Utsumi
Shinichi Tsutsumi as Tetsuya Ishigami
Yasuko Matsuyuki as Yasuko Hanaoka
Miho Kanazawa as Misato Hanaoka 
Kazuki Kitamura as Shunpei Kusanagi
Dankan as Kuniaki Kudo
Keishi Nagatsuka as Shinji Togashi

Reception
The film is not well known to the rest of the world, although it attracted much attention in Japan. It is not reviewed by any prominent English websites, but it was generally well received by both the audiences and the critics in the countries in which it has been shown. The film was very successful in Japan, grossing  ($52,323,944), becoming the 6th highest-grossing film of 2008, and the third highest-grossing domestic film of 2008.

References

External links 
 

2008 films
Japanese mystery thriller films
2000s Japanese-language films
2000s thriller films
Films based on Japanese novels
Films based on mystery novels
Films based on works by Keigo Higashino
Films directed by Hiroshi Nishitani
Films about mathematics
Films with screenplays by Yasushi Fukuda
Films produced by Kazutoshi Wadakura

ko:용의자 X의 헌신 (영화)
ja:容疑者Xの献身#映画